Queen for a Day is a 1951 American comedy film directed by Arthur Lubin and written by Seton I. Miller. The film stars Jack Bailey, Jim Morgan, Fort Pearson, Melanie York, Cynthia Corley, Kay Wiley and Helen Mowery. The film was released on July 7, 1951 by United Artists.

The film is related to Queen for a Day, an American quiz show that aired on radio beginning in 1945 and on television, hosted by Bailey, from 1956–64.

The film marked the screen debut of Leonard Nimoy.

Plot

Quiz show producer Jim Morgan reads letters from radio listeners to host Jack Bailey, telling their stories of the impact appearing as contestants on Queen for a Day had on their lives. The stories are The Gossamer World, The High Diver and Horsie.

In The Gossamer World Marjorie Watkins writes to the show thanking them for sending a toy engine to their six-year-old son Pete. Pete has a rampant imagination and is always telling stories. Marjorie tells her husband Dan she is worried Pete has no friends his own age. Pete meets Charles but hits him with a rock. Pete introduces his imaginary friend "Shun", short for "distinction", to his parents and blames Shun for his own accidents. Marjorie worries Pete will not take responsibility and Dan and he have a chat about this. Pete attends his first day at school and makes a friend, Jim, and says Shun was a silly game. Pete then contracts polio. Marjorie tells the show that the train means everything to him because it will be the only way he can get around until he walks again someday.

In The High Diver the son of immigrant parents attempts to raise money for college by doing a dangerous high dive.

Horsie tells of an elderly woman, childless and never married, who takes up nursing other peoples children in order to feel she still has a place in the world.

Cast

Broadcast Studio
Jack Bailey as Jack Bailey
Jim Morgan as Jim Morgan 
Fort Pearson as Ford Pearson
Melanie York as First Contestant
Cynthia Corley as Second Contestant
Kay Wiley as Third Contestant
Helen Mowery as Jan
Dian Fauntelle as Helena

"The Gossamer World"
Phyllis Avery as Marjorie
Darren McGavin as Dan
Rudy Lee as Pete
Frances E. Williams as Anna
Joan Winfield as Laura
Lonnie Burr as Charles
Tris Coffin as Doctor
Jiggs Wood as Mr. Beck
Casey Folks as Jim
George Sherwood as Mr. Garmes

"High Diver"
Adam Williams as Chuck
Kasia Orzazewski as Mrs. Nalawak
Ben Astar as Mr. Nalawak 
Tracey Roberts as Peggy
Larry Johns as Deacon McAllister
Bernard Szold as Daredevil Rinaldi
Joan Sudlow as Mrs. McAllister
Grace Lenard as Mrs. Rinaldi
Leonard Nimoy as Chief
Danny Davenport as Satchelbutt
Madge Blake as Mrs. Kimpel

"Horsie"
Edith Meiser as Miss Wilmarth
Dan Tobin as Owen Cruger
Jessie Cavitt as Camilla Cruger
Douglas Evans as Freddy Forster
Don Shelton as Jack Minot
Louise Currie as Secretary
Sheila Watson as Mary	
Minna Phillips as The Cook
Byron Keith as The Chauffeur

Production
Queen for a Day was a popular radio quiz show in the 1940s and 1950s with an audience of five million. Film rights to the show had been optioned by Seymour Nebenzal and Jesse L. Lasky but neither had exercised the option. In September 1949 Robert Stillman, a former associate of Stanley Kramer, bought the screen rights from the Raymond B Morgan advertising company. Stillman had been looking to make an American anthology film along the lines of Trio (1950) and felt by using the quiz show as a framing device, "We found a commercial hook for a picture we didn't have to compromise with."

Stillman was going to make the film as his first under a deal with United Artists but then decided to make The Condemned (which became The Sound of Fury) instead. Queen for a Day would be the second in a proposed slate of six films.

In November 1949 Seton I Miller signed to be an associate producer and to write the script.

The original plan was to film four stories. In January 1950 Stillman bought the screen rights to the story "The High Diver" by John Ainsworth, which he intended use as one of the stories in the movie. The same month he bought the rights to Faith Baldwin's 1948 magazine story "This Gossamer World". The third story, "Horsie" was written by Dorothy Parker, was purchased in June. In the end, these were the only stories used, with Miller adapting them into a script.

Lubin signed to make the film in February 1950.  Unlike many anthology series, one person, Lubin, directed every episode.

Casting
Most of the 36 cast were relative unknowns to film, although some had theatre experience. Darren McGavin, then best known for appearing on stage in Death of a Salesman was cast in September. Stillman reportedly wanted Mickey Rooney's son Mickey Rooney Jr to play a role in "This Gossamer World" but Mickey refused.

Filming
Filming started September 1950.

A slightly different version of the film was made for release in France, where the quiz show was formatted differently.

Reception
The film had its world premiere in Waycross Georgia because it sent in the most requests to have a premiere, per ratio.
The Los Angeles Times praised the "exceptionally capable" younger actors.

Diabolique magazine said the third segment "was based on a story by Dorothy Parker, whose satirical point about beauty is muted in this adaptation – perhaps Lubin was too "nice" a director to do it justice. The other stories are warmly done... but put together they don't t quite work as a movie – maybe it would’ve been better had Lubin been restricted to a 65-minute running time like in the old days."

The film was released in some markets as Horsie.

Stillman was meant to follow it with an adaptation of Island in the Sky written by Miller.

References

External links 
 
 

Review of film at Variety

1951 films
American black-and-white films
1950s English-language films
United Artists films
American comedy films
1951 comedy films
Films based on radio series
Films scored by Hugo Friedhofer
1950s American films
English-language comedy films